Lomariopsis lineata is a species of fern native to South East Asia. The prothallia are commonly cultivated as an  aquarium plant, where it is known to aquarists as süsswassertang. It is often incorrectly spelled "subwassertang" due to the German eszett's similarity to the Latin 'B'. It is also called Loma fern or  round pellia.

Description
Adult leaves are pinnate and up to 1 meter in length. It is found in humid forests up to 1,200 meters above sea level. It may grow epiphytic on trees or among rocks in dry river beds.

Although Flora of China separates the species, L. cochinchinensis is considered a synonym of L. lineata. The species may grow to be 3 meters in length. In Singapore, L. lineata is considered critically endangered in the wild.

Süsswassertang 
Süsswassertang is used as a decorative aquarium plant. It was first discovered in the aquarium of botanist Christel Kasselmann in 2001, who then distributed it to other hobby aquarists. The wild origin is unknown. The name süsswassertang means "freshwater seaweed" in German. It was long considered to be a liverwort, which it strongly resembles.  All specimens in the aquarium trade are assumed to be clones of the original plant introduced in 2001.

In 2009, a molecular phylogenetic study determined that it is, in fact, a fern gametophyte. It was found to be most closely genetically linked to Lomariopsis lineata, though classification as a distinct species was not ruled out. Efforts to induce süsswassertang specimens to form a sporophyte have failed, which may indicate status as a new species. It is sometimes described as Lomariopsis cf. lineata.

Characteristics
In captivity, reproduction is by fragmentation. Pieces that break off develop into new plants. 
The plant is thalloid in form, and exhibits indeterminate growth. It is profusely branched, and 1 cell-layer thick. Gametangia are rarely produced. The archegonia have short necks and the venter (base) is partly sunk into the thallus. The antheridia are like those of polypodialean ferns in that they consist of a basal cell, a ring cell, and a cap cell.

The species is capable of absorbing the neurotoxin BMAA from contaminated waters.

References

Polypodiales
Freshwater plants